Webensenu was an ancient Egyptian prince of the Eighteenth Dynasty. He was a son of Pharaoh Amenhotep II.

He is mentioned, along with his brother Nedjem, on a statue of Minmose, overseer of the works in Karnak. He died as a child and may have been buried in his father's tomb, KV35, possibly being the mummy laid alongside Tiye and the Younger Lady. His canopic jars and shabtis were found in the tomb as well. His possible mummy is still there, and it indicates that he may have died around the age of ten.

Sources

Princes of the Eighteenth Dynasty of Egypt
Ancient Egyptian mummies
Children of Amenhotep II

Royalty who died as children